It Snowed is a 2011 Christmas album by a Canadian singer-songwriter Meaghan Smith. It was released on November 1, 2011.

Track listing
 Breakable
 Silver Bells
 Baby, It's Cold Outside (with Buck 65)
 It Snowed
 Christmas Time Is Here
 Christmas Kiss
 Little Drummer Boy
 Zat U Santa Claus?
 Silent Night

2011 Christmas albums
Christmas albums by Canadian artists
Nettwerk Records albums
Folk Christmas albums